Teluk Penyu Beach (Indonesian: Pantai Teluk Penyu, meaning "Sea Turtle Bay Beach") is a brown sand beach in Cilacap, Central Java. Named for its former sea turtle population, the beach is one of the most popular tourist attractions in the area.

Description

On the southern coast of Java, it faces the Indian Ocean. It is accessible by public and private transportation.

Along the brown sand beach are numerous restaurants, many serving grilled fish. Souvenirs and hotels are also available. Fishing is a popular pastime at the beach, which is crowded with local residents on the weekends. Boats are available for rent, as are water activities such as banana boats. Access to other tourist attractions is available through Teluk Penyu, including the abandoned fortress of Benteng Pendem, located on the west side of the beach, and the island of Nusa Kambangan, which is accessible through a short boat ride. On this island there are several further beaches, including Karang Bolong.

Every Satu Suro (the first day of the Javanese calendar) the local residents perform a ritual known as Sedekah Laut (Alms to the Sea) in order to thank God for protecting them while fishing. During this ritual, a procession leaves the office of the regent of Cilacap, heading to Teluk Penyu. At sea, water buffalo heads and other offerings are thrown into the sea by fishermen; according to local tradition, this must be completed by noon. Afterwards, cultural activities such as wayang (shadow puppet) shows, kuda lumping dances, and musical performances are held. In 2009, Sedekah Laut attracted 3,000 participants and another 5,000 spectators.

History
Historically, Teluk Penyu was home to many sea turtles; this led to the beach receiving its current name, penyu meaning "sea turtle" in Indonesian. However, such turtles can no longer be found at the beach. This has been attributed to the shipping traffic which passes through the area after leaving the Cilacap port, as well as increased pressure from the tourism industry, which began to develop in the area in 1976.

The beach is used by many fisherman – 35,000 in 2009 – as a place for resting and launching their boats. Teluk Penyu is a major source of income for the region; in 2008, it and Benteng Pendem provided most of the regency's Rp 400 million in tourist revenue. However, development of the beach for tourism has been limited by the fact that much of the land is owned by the Indonesian Army.

Views
Agus Maryono of The Jakarta Post described the views of the sea from Teluk Penyu as "undeniably beautiful".

References

Works cited

External links

Beaches of Central Java
Tourist attractions in Central Java
Cilacap Regency
Landforms of Java